The South African Railways Class J 4-6-4T of 1915 was a steam locomotive.

In 1915, the South African Railways placed six Class J tank steam locomotives with a 4-6-4 Baltic type wheel arrangement in service.

Manufacturer

To cope with the increasing traffic on the Natal South Coast, D.A. Hendrie, the Chief Mechanical Engineer (CME) of the South African Railways (SAR), reverted to the old Natal Government Railways preference and designed a new  Baltic type side-tank steam locomotive.

Six of these locomotives were built by Nasmyth, Wilson and Company of Patricroft in Salford, England, and delivered in 1915, numbered in the range from 341 to 346. They were designated Class J and were the first side-tank engines to be acquired by the SAR since Union.

Characteristics
The engines used saturated steam and had Walschaerts valve gear, piston valves and Belpaire fireboxes. They were designed to work as double-enders on the Natal South Coast line where there was limited engine turning facilities.

Service
It was soon found, however, that due to their small proportions, they were of insufficient power to handle the rapidly increasing loads on the South Coast. They were therefore taken off the South Coast run and employed as shunting engines in the Durban harbour.

Four of them were later allocated to Mossel Bay and the Cape Midland for similar duties. They remained there until they were withdrawn by 1957 after more than forty years in service. The remaining two locomotives, numbers 341 and 342, were sold to gold mines on the Reef.

By the early 1970s, no. 341 was still at work on the East Daggafontein Mine as their no. 2. It was later acquired by the South African National Railway And Steam Museum (SANRASM) for preservation. It had to be scrapped in 2011, however, after being vandalised by scavenging scrap metal thieves at the SANRASM storage site in Chamdor.

Illustration
No. 341 was plinthed at SANRASM with a tender. The picture shows it as gate guard, prior to being vandalised into destruction c. 2010.

References

1160
1160
4-6-4 locomotives
2C2 locomotives
4-6-4T locomotives
Nasmyth, Wilson and Company locomotives
Cape gauge railway locomotives
Railway locomotives introduced in 1915
1915 in South Africa